1987 is the natural number following 1986 and preceding 1988.

In mathematics
1987 is an odd number and the 300th prime number. It is the first number of a sexy prime triplet (1987, 1993, 1999). Being of the form 4n + 3, it is a Gaussian prime. It is a lucky number and therefore also a lucky prime. 1987 is a prime factor of the 9th number in Sylvester's sequence, and is the 15th prime to divide any number in the sequence.

There are 1987 polyiamonds with 12 cells that tile the plane isohedrally.

In other fields 
UN 1987 is the UN number for the hazardous substance "Alcohols, N.O.S." (N.O.S. stands for not otherwise specified).
There are 1987 ways to place four non-attacking chess kings on a 5 × 5 board.

References 

Integers